Dinty Moore may refer to:

Dinty Moore, a comic strip character in Bringing Up Father (also known as Jiggs and Maggie) and the eponym of many other "Dinty" Moores.
Francis Moore (ice hockey) (1900–1976), Canadian hockey player
Charles "Dinty" Moore, American band leader and christener of Red Buttons.
F. W. "Dinty" Moore Trophy, a trophy of the Ontario Hockey League 
Dinty Moore (American football) (1903-1978), American football player
Dinty W. Moore (born 1955), American essayist
Dinty Moore, a line of food products by American Hormel Foods
Dinty Moore sandwich, in the cuisine of Detroit, a sandwich similar to a Reuben sandwich